The Robert and Concetta Dwyer Arena houses two ice surfaces, both 200 x 85 ft., and pro shop on Niagara University's campus in Lewiston, New York, United States. The main rink can seat up to 1,400 people and is the home to the Niagara Purple Eagles men's ice hockey team, which plays in Atlantic Hockey. The arena was formerly home to the women's ice hockey team, which played in College Hockey America. 

The building was built in 1996. Prior to the 1999–2000 season, major renovation took place as a result of a gift by Bob and Connie Dwyer, both 1965 graduates, who contributed $3 million for facilities upgrades. Locker and training rooms, players' lounge, and lobby were upgraded, while separate entrances for the main and auxiliary rinks, new pro shop, and new ticket office were arranged. In the summer of 2007 a premium seating section was added in the area formerly occupied by the Party Deck, and as a result, capacity was increased from 1,600 to 2,100. The current seating capacity is 1,400.

It hosted the College Hockey America 2002, 2008, and 2010 men's conference tournaments and the 2004 and 2008 women's conference tournaments.  Dwyer was home of the Buffalo Sabres Summer Development Camp in 2008, 2009, 2010 and 2011 which featured young prospects and draft picks in the Sabres organization.  The arena co-hosted the 2011 World Junior Ice Hockey Championships.

External links
 

Indoor arenas in New York (state)
College ice hockey venues in the United States
Sports venues in New York (state)
Indoor ice hockey venues in the United States
Niagara Purple Eagles ice hockey
Sports venues in Niagara County, New York
1996 establishments in New York (state)
Sports venues completed in 1996